The National Christian Centre (previously known as the National Ecumenical Centre and sometimes known as the National Church of Nigeria) is a Christian place of worship in Nigeria's capital, Abuja. The centre is an inter-denominational church building.

History
The church was designed in a Postmodern version of the Neo-gothic style by Nigerian architectural firm, Darchiwork Group; located in Lagos.

The project was started around 1989, then lay dormant for several years until 2004, when the Christian Association of Nigeria organized a committee to ensure its speedy completion. The dedication, on 2 October 2005, coincided with the celebration of Nigeria’s 45th anniversary as an independent nation. 

The dedication service was presided over by the Most Reverend Peter Akinola, the Anglican Primate of Nigeria.

Layout and access

The church is built in a neo-gothic style and has several pivoted arches with a wide nave leading to the altar. The altar, placed at the centre of the church completes a full rotation every ten minutes. A pipe organ is fitted to the right wing of the church, close to which sits the choir. Stained glass windows which employ a simple but attractive mix of yellow, green and red colours can be seen all around the church. 

When not being used for Christian ceremonies, it is open to the public. Guided tours are available for anyone interested in having a look. In some cases, members of the public are only allowed to tour the church when accompanied by a guide.

See also
Christianity in Nigeria

References

Churches in Abuja
Landmarks in Nigeria
Anglican church buildings in Nigeria
Postmodern architecture
Churches completed in 2005
2005 establishments in Nigeria
21st-century Anglican church buildings
21st-century churches in Nigeria
Gothic architecture in Nigeria